Inquisitor is a genus of small predatory sea snails,  marine gastropod mollusks in the family Pseudomelatomidae.

Distribution
This marine genus occurs in the Indo-west Pacific, from the Red Sea and East Africa to Japan; also off Australia.

Species
According to the World Register of Marine Species (WoRMS), the following species with valid names are included within the genus Inquisitor:

 Inquisitor acervatus Cotton, 1947
 Inquisitor adenicus Sysoev, 1996
 Inquisitor aemula (Angas, 1877)
 Inquisitor aesopus (Schepman, 1913)
 Inquisitor alabaster (Reeve, 1843)
 Inquisitor angustiliratus Sysoev, 1996
 Inquisitor angustus Kuroda & Oyama, 1971
 Inquisitor arctatus Kilburn, 1988
 Inquisitor armillatus Stahlschmidt & Fraussen, 2014
  † Inquisitor awamoaensis (Hutton, 1873) 
 Inquisitor carmen (G. B. Sowerby III, 1916)
 Inquisitor chocolatus (E. A. Smith, 1875)
 Inquisitor citreus Stahlschmidt & Fraussen, 2022
 † Inquisitor cosibensis (Yokoyama, 1920) 
 † Inquisitor cotteri Vredenburg, 1921  
 Inquisitor dampieria  (Hedley, 1922) 
 Inquisitor eburatus Bozzetti, 2011  
 Inquisitor elachystoma (Martens, 1901)
 Inquisitor elegans  Bozzetti, 1994
 Inquisitor elkeae Stahlschmidt, 2013
 Inquisitor exiguus (Kuroda & Oyama, 1971)
 † Inquisitor flemingi (Vella, 1954) 
 Inquisitor flindersianus Hedley, 1922
 Inquisitor formidabilis Hedley, 1922
 † Inquisitor fraudator (Finlay & Marwick, 1937)  
 Inquisitor frausseni Stahlschmidt, Poppe & Tagaro, 2018 
 Inquisitor fusiformis Stahlschmidt, 2013
 Inquisitor glauce (Dall, 1918) 
 Inquisitor harrymonti Stahlschmidt, Poppe & Tagaro, 2018 
 † Inquisitor hebes Marwick, 1931 
 Inquisitor hedleyi (Verco, 1909) 
 Inquisitor hormophorus Sysoev & Bouchet, 2001 
 Inquisitor imperceptus Stahlschmidt & Fraussen, 2022
 Inquisitor incertus (E. A. Smith, 1877)
 Inquisitor indistinctus Sysoev, 1996
 Inquisitor insignita (Melvill, 1923)
 Inquisitor interrupta  (Lamarck, 1816)
 Inquisitor intertinctus (E. A. Smith, 1877)
 Inquisitor isabella Kilburn, 1988
 † Inquisitor ischnos (Philippi, 1887)  
 Inquisitor janae Stahlschmidt & Fraussen, 2022
 Inquisitor japonicus (Lischke, 1869)
 Inquisitor kilburni Wells, 1994
 † Inquisitor komiticus Laws, 1939 
 Inquisitor kurodai (Habe & Kosuge, 1966) 
 † Inquisitor lanceolatus (Hupé, 1854) 
 Inquisitor lassulus Hedley, 1922
 Inquisitor latifasciata (G. B. Sowerby II, 1870)
 Inquisitor latiriformis Kilburn, 1988
 Inquisitor lorenzi Stahlschmidt, Poppe & Tagaro, 2018 
 Inquisitor mactanensis Stahlschmidt, Poppe & Tagaro, 2018 
 Inquisitor mastersi (Brazier, 1876) 
 Inquisitor michaelmonti Stahlschmidt, Poppe & Tagaro, 2018 
 Inquisitor midas Stahlschmidt & Fraussen, 2022
 Inquisitor millepunctatus Stahlschmidt, Poppe & Tagaro, 2018 
 Inquisitor minutosternalis Kosuge, 1993
 Inquisitor mirabelflorenti Cossignani, 2016
 Inquisitor modulatus Stahlschmidt & Fraussen, 2022
 Inquisitor multilirata (E. A. Smith, 1877)
 Inquisitor nodicostatus Kilburn, 1988
 Inquisitor nudivaricosus Kuroda & Oyama, 1971
 Inquisitor odhneri Wells, 1994
 Inquisitor plurinodulatus Cotton, 1947
 Inquisitor plurivaricis Li B.Q., Kilburn & Li X.Z., 2010
 † Inquisitor powelli (Dell, 1950) 
 Inquisitor pseudoprincipalis (Yokoyama, 1920)
 Inquisitor radula (Hinds, 1843)
 Inquisitor ritae Stahlschmidt & Fraussen, 2017
 Inquisitor rubens Morassi, 1998
 Inquisitor rufovaricosus (Kuroda & Oyama, 1971)
 Inquisitor sexradiata (Odhner, 1917)
 † Inquisitor shibanoi Masuda, 1967
 Inquisitor solomonensis (E. A. Smith, 1876)
 Inquisitor spicata  (Hinds, 1843)
 Inquisitor stenos Sysoev, 1996
 Inquisitor sterrha   (R. B. Watson, 1881)
 Inquisitor subangusta (Schepman, 1913)
 Inquisitor taivaricosa Chang & Wu, 2000
 Inquisitor variabilis (E. A. Smith, 1877)
 Inquisitor varicosus (Reeve, 1843)
 Inquisitor vesculus Stahlschmidt & Fraussen, 2022
 Inquisitor vividus Li B.Q., Kilburn & Li X.Z., 2010
 Inquisitor vulpionis Kuroda & Oyama, 1971
  † Inquisitor waihoraensis Marwick, 1931
 Inquisitor zebra (Lamarck, 1822)
 Inquisitor zonata  (Reeve, 1843)

Species brought into synonymy
 Inquisitor acutus Marwick, 1928 †: synonym of Mauidrillia acuta (Marwick, 1928) †
 Inquisitor alma Thiele, 1930: synonym of Inquisitor lassulus Hedley, 1922
 Inquisitor asper Marwick, 1926 †: synonym of Aoteadrillia asper (Marwick, 1926)†
 Inquisitor coriorudis Hedley, 1922: synonym of Vexitomina coriorudis'(Hedley, 1922) (original combination)
 Inquisitor coxi Angas, 1867: synonym of Vexitomina coxi (Angas, 1867)
 Inquisitor essingtonensis Smith, 1888: synonym of Inquisitor mastersi (Brazier, 1876)
 Inquisitor exigua Marwick, 1931 †: synonym of Aoteadrillia exigua (Marwick, 1931) † (original combination)
 Inquisitor fibratus Hedley, 1922: synonym of Inquisitor spicata (Hinds, 1843)
 Inquisitor flavidula [sic]: synonym of Inquisitor flavidulus (Lamarck, 1822): synonym of Clathrodrillia flavidula (Lamarck, 1822) (incorrect gender ending)
 Inquisitor flavidulus (Lamarck, 1822): synonym of Clathrodrillia flavidula (Lamarck, 1822)
 Inquisitor granobalteus Hedley, 1922: synonym of Turricula granobalteus (Hedley, 1922)  (original combination)
 Inquisitor immaculatus Tenison-Woods, 1876: synonym of Paracuneus immaculatus (Tenison-Woods, 1876)
 Inquisitor ihungia Marwick, 1931 †: synonym of Aoteadrillia ihungia (Marwick, 1931) † (original combination)
 Inquisitor japonicum [sic]: synonym of Inquisitor japonicus (Lischke, 1869) (incorrect gender ending)
 Inquisitor jeffreysii (E. A. Smith, 1875): synonym of Funa jeffreysii (E. A. Smith, 1875)
 Inquisitor kawamurai (Habe & Kosuge, 1966) : synonym of Cheungbeia kawamurai (Habe & Kosuge, 1966) 
 Inquisitor lacertosus Hedley, 1922: synonym of Bathytoma lacertosus (Hedley, 1922)  (original combination)
 Inquisitor laterculata (G. B. Sowerby II, 1870): synonym of Cheungbeia laterculata (G. B. Sowerby II, 1870)
 Inquisitor laterculoides (Barnard, 1958): synonym of Funa laterculoides (Barnard, 1958)
 Inquisitor mammillata (Kuroda and Oyama，1971): synonym of Mammillaedrillia mammillata (Kuroda and Oyama，1971)
 Inquisitor metcalfei Angas, 1867: synonym of Vexitomina metcalfei (Angas, 1867)
 Inquisitor minimarus Kosuge, 1993: synonym of Ptychobela minimarus (Kosuge, 1993)
 Inquisitor multicostellata Smith, 1888: synonym of Inquisitor latifasciata (Sowerby, 1870)
 Inquisitor nudivaricosa Kuroda, Habe & Oyama, 1971: synonym of Inquisitor nudivaricosus Kuroda, Habe & Oyama, 1971
 Inquisitor perclathrata Kuroda, 1960: synonym of Clavus (Clathrodrillia) perclathrata Azuma, 1960 (nomen nudum)
 Inquisitor petilinus Hedley, 1922: synonym of Conticosta petilinus (Hedley, 1922) (original combination)
 † Inquisitor problematicus Powell, 1942 : synonym of † Inquisitor awamoaensis (Hutton, 1873) 
 Inquisitor sinensis (Hinds, 1843): synonym of Crassispira sinensis (Hinds, 1843)
 Inquisitor spadix (Watson, 1886): synonym of Paracuneus immaculatus (Tenison-Woods, 1876)
 Inquisitor spaldingi (Brazier, 1876): synonym of Inquisitor spicata (Hinds, 1843)
 Inquisitor spurius Hedley, 1922: synonym of Turricula nelliae spuria (Hedley, 1922) (original combination)
 Inquisitor suavis Smith, 1888: synonym of Vexitomina suavis (Smith, 1888)
 Inquisitor subochracea (E. A. Smith, 1877): synonym of Aguilaria subochracea (E. A. Smith, 1877)
 Inquisitor taylorianus (Reeve, 1846): synonym of Funa tayloriana (Reeve, 1846)
 Inquisitor tuberosa (E.A. Smith, 1875): synonym of Brachytoma tuberosa (E. A. Smith, 1875) 
 Inquisitor ventricosa Smith, 1888 : synonym of Inquisitor glauce (Dall, 1918) 
 Inquisitor versicolor Weinkauff & Kobelt, 1876: synonym of Inquisitor radula (Hinds, 1843)
 Inquisitor vexillium (Habe & Kosuge, 1966) : synonym of Ptychobela vexillium (Habe & Kosuge, 1966) 

See also
 List of marine gastropod genera in the fossil record

References

 Sysoev, A. & Bouchet, P. 2001. New and uncommon turriform gastropods (Gastropoda: Conoidea) from the south-west Pacific. Mémoires du Muséum national d'Histoire naturelle, Paris [1936-1950] 185: 271–320
 Wilson, B. 1994. Australian marine shells. Prosobranch gastropods.'' Kallaroo, WA : Odyssey Publishing Vol. 2 370 pp.

External links
 Hedley C. (1918). A checklist of the marine fauna of New South Wales. Part 1. Journal and Proceedings of the Royal Society of New South Wales. 51: M1-M120
  Hedley, C. 1922. A revision of the Australian Turridae. Records of the Australian Museum 13(6): 213-359, pls 42-56 
 
 Bouchet, P.; Kantor, Y. I.; Sysoev, A.; Puillandre, N. (2011). A new operational classification of the Conoidea (Gastropoda). Journal of Molluscan Studies. 77(3): 273-308
 Worldwide Mollusc Species Data Base: Pseudomelatomidae